Multiple Access Ltd v McCutcheon is a leading constitutional decision of the Supreme Court of Canada on the resolution of overlapping federal and provincial laws under the doctrine of double aspect.

Background

Multiple Access, a company incorporated under the Canada Corporations Act made an offer to acquire the broadcasting assets of Canadian Marconi Limited, which was accepted. Two shareholders of Multiple Access applied to the Ontario courts to have the Ontario Securities Commission commence an action against several directors and officers of the company for insider trading under the Ontario Securities Act.

In its defence, the company argued that the provisions of the provincial Act were inoperative under the paramountcy doctrine as it overlapped with insider trading provisions in the Canada Corporations Act.

Lower courts
At first instance, Henry J in Weekly Court held the provincial provisions in question were valid and still in effect. He stated that when both a provincial and a federal statute have occupied a field, the test that gives rise to the doctrine of paramountcy is whether the two statutes can "live together and operate concurrently." The doctrine of paramountcy does not necessarily arise because an individual is subject to prohibition and penalty under both statutes at the same time.

The Divisional Court reversed. Morden J, speaking for the Court, held that the constitutional doctrine of paramountcy operates to invalidate provincial legislation if it duplicates valid federal legislation in such a way that the two provisions cannot live together and operate concurrently. If the federal and provincial provisions are virtually identical, are directed to achieving the same policy, and create the same rights and obligations, the duplication attracts the doctrine of paramountcy. On appeal, the Ontario Court of Appeal agreed with the Divisional Court ruling.

Supreme Court
These issues were before the Supreme Court:

 whether ss. 100.4 and 100.5 of the Canada Corporations Act are ultra vires Parliament in whole or in part;
 whether ss. 113 and 114 of the Securities Act are ultra vires the Legislature of Ontario in whole or in part, and
 if both are intra vires, whether ss. 113 and 114 of the Ontario Act are suspended and inoperative by reason of the doctrine of paramountcy.

Dickson J, for the majority, held that both Acts were valid, and the doctrine of paramountcy did not apply.

Dickson first considered the nature of provisions relating to insider trading, and found that they could fall under either securities law or company law. As that could then fall under either federal or provincial jurisdiction, he noted:

Dickson examined the Securities Act using the Lederman approach of judicial review, which states:

He found that the Act was valid under the provincial authority over matters of property and civil rights under section 92(13) of the Constitution Act, 1867. He then considered the federal Act, which he found to be valid under the federal powers relating to trade and commerce as well as peace, order and good government.

Dickson then considered whether there was a conflict between the two Acts. He found that there was no conflict. The laws duplicated each other and had the same legislative objective. There is no problem with laws operating concurrently, Dickson argued. Mere duplication without actual conflict or contradiction is not sufficient to invoke the doctrine of paramountcy and render otherwise valid provincial legislation inoperative. Instead, there must be an actual conflict between the laws where compliance with one law will necessarily violate the other. However, any claimant seeking action under the Securities Act will be able to successfully use only one.

See also
 List of Supreme Court of Canada cases (Laskin Court)

References

Canadian federalism case law
Supreme Court of Canada cases
1982 in Canadian case law